Lauttasaari metro station is an underground station on the Helsinki Metro. Lauttasaari is a part of the Länsimetro extension. It serves the neighborhood of Lauttasaari in Helsinki. Lauttasaari is served by both lines M1 and M2. There are two entrances to the station, one from the shopping centre Lauttis and one from Gyldénintie street. The station is located 1,6 kilometres east from Koivusaari metro station and 2,2 kilometres west from Ruoholahti metro station.

References

External links
Länsimetro work in progress

Helsinki Metro stations
2017 establishments in Finland
Lauttasaari